The Salt Lake Daily Herald was a daily newspaper in Salt Lake City, Utah. It may also be known as the Salt Lake Herald.

It was founded in 1870 by publishers William C. Dunbar and Edward L. Sloan. The Herald ceased publication in 1920. 

It was at one time housed in the Herald Building (Salt Lake City), when the newspaper was owned by William A. Clark, a wealthy entrepreneur and politician from Montana.

See also
Daily Herald (Utah)
List of newspapers in Utah

References

Newspapers published in Utah
Mass media in Salt Lake City
Publications established in 1870
Publications disestablished in 1920
1870 establishments in Utah Territory
1920 disestablishments in Utah